Lee Jung-hyuk is a South Korean actor and model. He is known for his in dramas such as I Can Hear Your Voice, On the Way to the Airport and he is also known for his roles in movies such as Fists of Legend.

Filmography

Television series

Film

References

External links 
 
 
 

1985 births
Living people
21st-century South Korean male actors
South Korean male models
South Korean male television actors
South Korean male film actors